Corinthians Futebol Clube de Santo André, commonly known as Corinthians de Santo André or Corinthinhas, is a Brazilian sports club based in Santo André, São Paulo.

It was founded on 15 August 1912 in São Bernardo do Campo, under the name Corinthians Foot-Ball Club, Portuguese: "Corinthians de São Bernardo." In 1938 when the city of Santo André emancipated from São Bernardo do Campo the club became "Corinthians de Santo André."

The team played twelve editions of the São Paulo football championship, for the second, third and fourth divisions.  Currently, it only contests amateur  championships.

History
Like the Sport Club Corinthians Paulista, the name of the team of Santo André also arose due to the Corinthian Football Club, the English team that toured Brazil. Among the founders the two final proposals of name were Flower of India and Corinthians. The first team was formed by João, Túlio, Manetti, Polesi and Veronesi, Jacomo and Américo, Paulista, Cortez, Severino and Carmine.

The first match and goal of Pelé was against Corinthians de Santo André, in a friendly match of celebration of the Independence, on 7 September 1956.

References

1912 establishments in Brazil
Sports clubs established in 1912
Defunct football clubs in São Paulo (state)
Multi-sport clubs in Brazil